The Rossiter–McLaughlin effect is a spectroscopic phenomenon observed when an object moves across the face of a star.

Description

The Rossiter–McLaughlin effect is a spectroscopic phenomenon observed when either an eclipsing binary's secondary star or an extrasolar planet is seen to transit across the face of the primary or parent star.

As the main star rotates on its axis, one quadrant of its photosphere will be seen to be coming towards the viewer, and the other visible quadrant to be moving away. These motions produce blueshifts and redshifts, respectively, in the star's spectrum, usually observed as a broadening of the spectral lines. When the secondary star or planet transits the primary, it blocks part of the latter's disc, preventing some of the shifted light from reaching the observer. That causes the observed mean redshift of the primary star as a whole to vary from its normal value. As the transiting object moves across to the other side of the star's disc, the redshift anomaly will switch from being negative to being positive, or vice versa.

Retrograde Motion of Hot Jupiters
This effect has been used to show that as many as 25% of hot Jupiters are orbiting in a retrograde direction with respect to their parent stars, strongly suggesting that dynamical interactions rather than planetary migration produce these objects.

History 
J. R. Holt in 1893 proposed a method to measure the stellar rotation of stars by using radial velocity measurements. He predicted that when one star of an eclipsing binary eclipsed the other, it would first cover the advancing blueshifted half and then the receding redshifted half. That motion would create a redshift of the eclipsed star's spectrum followed by a blueshift, which would thus appear as a change in the measured radial velocity in addition to that caused by the orbital motion of the eclipsed star.

The effect is named after Richard Alfred Rossiter and Dean Benjamin McLaughlin.

Further reading

References

External links

Planetary science
Astronomical spectroscopy
Doppler effects